Travel Sick is a British hybrid comedy-travel television series that originally aired on Bravo from 2001 to 2002. It placed UK writer Grub Smith in a different region of the world in each episode. In each destination, he was asked to complete five undesirable challenges posed by the show's producers. If he failed a challenge, he was forced to perform something unpleasant called a "forfeit".  The more he failed, the worse the "forfeit" at the end of the show became.

The series has also aired on Comedy Central in the United States.

Series 1 (2001)

Series 2 (2002)

External links
 

2001 British television series debuts
2002 British television series endings
2000s British travel television series
British comedy television shows
Bravo (British TV channel) original programming
Comedy Central original programming
English-language television shows